Preacher's Daughter is the debut studio album by American singer-songwriter Hayden Anhedönia, under the stage name Ethel Cain, released on May 12, 2022, through Daughters of Cain Records. It is a concept album "centered around the character Ethel Cain,  who runs away from home only to meet a gruesome end at the hands of a cannibalistic psychopath." Upon release, the album received universal acclaim from music critics, who lauded the production, storytelling, cohesiveness, and Cain's songwriting.

Composition 
Preacher's Daughter is an Americana, pop rock, folk, ethereal, alt-pop, goth-pop, and dark ambient album with influences from slowcore, heartland rock, classic rock, cock rock, sludge, gospel, industrial, noise, horror-electronica, country and drone.

"Family Tree (Intro)" opens with a distorted recording of a Southern preacher, foreshadowing the religious themes to come. "American Teenager" is a heartland rock, country rock, and ambient pop song lead by synths and guitars that tells of teenage American nostalgia. "A House in Nebraska" is an eight-minute torch song featuring "angelic melodies, layers of reverb twisting around each other with dizzying clarity" and ends with an arena rock guitar solo. "Western Nights" is a pop rock song about "a woman and her Harley-riding boyfriend crossing state lines, on the run from their past and still bearing family traumas." "Hard Times" is a bedroom pop song wherein "Cain admits to fearing how badly she wants to emulate the fatherly authorities in her life who brought her harm". "Gibson Girl" "achieves a delicate mix of sultry and haunting" with its "American-gothic eroticism" that shows the faults of the American Dream, ending with a stadium rock guitar solo. "Family Tree" blends sludge and outlaw country as Cain "reveals the deadly agency her persona wields" as she reckons with "a genealogy marked by violence on all fronts" "Thoroughfare" is a country-inspired epic that "replaces the intensity of electric guitars with swelling vocals, reverberating drums and a cathartic whimsy," ending with a tambourine and scat singing jam session.

The album's climax "Ptolemaea" is an industrial doom metal song named after the ninth circle of Hell in Dante's Inferno that houses Ethel Cain's namesake. "Horrifying and awe-striking", Cain "holler[s] with horror and anguish just as the guitars plunge into disarray and the occasional blast beat appears." The preacher from the intro returns to speak distorted incantations for the Daughters of Cain and "their whore mothers". After "Ptolemaea" comes two instrumental tracks, "August Underground" and "Televangelism". The former is a doom-ambient track with low-register guitars and siren vocalizations that is "meant to represent Cain’s attempted escape from, and ultimate death at the hands of, her murderous lover". "Televangelism" is a piano-led piece drowned in reverb that, towards the end, becomes swallowed by tape hiss, highlighting the "artificiality" of televangelism and "allegorizing [Cain's] ascent to heaven. "Sun Bleached Flies" is a country power ballad that "wrestl[es] with the contradictions of organized religion" Album closer "Strangers" is influenced by hair rock and grunge that ends in "a swarm of energetic chaos", with Cain now a "freezer bride" in her killer's basement, awaiting consumption, as she sends out one final message of love to her mother.

Critical reception 

Preacher's Daughter received a score of 82 out of 100 based on eight reviews from media aggregate site Metacritic, indicating "universal acclaim". In a five-star review for DIY, Ben Tipple wrote that Cain "has an unparalleled power to drag you into her world" and called her "an autobiographical embodiment of escape, and of a fresh start". Jessie Atkinson of Gigwise named Preacher's Daughter "an American epic" and that "Ethel Cain is only 24 and has already written something as striking and with as much potential for cultural impact". Crack writer Emma Garland called Cain's voice "resplendent and seemingly infinite in register, and transforming this landslide of beauty and suffering into some of the most fearless songwriting in recent memory."

Devon Chodzin of Paste, wrote that "where one may knock some of the power ballads for sameness, one might instead find consistency, an album grounded in the artist’s inspirations and narrative mission that is, above all, tantalizing. It is hard not to crave more." The Line of Best Fit contributor Paul Bridgewater called the album "thematically a reckoning of salvation and oppression, all played out across the battlefield of religion and love. It's an ambitious undertaking for a first album, but Cain's success largely comes down to embracing the universal language of pop as her mother tongue and keeping a deft hand over all aspects of her work, as both songwriter and producer." Clash writer Oshen Douglas McCormick called it "a heart-wrenching collection of songs that urges the listener to give themselves over to this album as much as Ethel Cain gives herself over to you."

In June 2022, Preacher's Daughter was listed as one of the best albums of the year so far by Gorilla vs. Bear. In July 2022, Paste named "American Teenager" the best song of the year so far, with contributor Jacqueline Codiga describing it as "a deeply felt portrait of a doomed, yet hopeful character" and writing that it "has the stadium-sized scale, relatability and ambition to become the biggest song in the entire country".

Track listing 
All tracks written and produced by Ethel Cain, except where noted.

References

External links

2022 debut albums
Concept albums
Ethel Cain albums
AWAL albums